Fryeburg Academy, founded in 1792, is one of the oldest private schools in the United States, located in Fryeburg, Maine. Among notable faculty, Daniel Webster was one of the first Heads of School, teaching at the school for a year.

Boarding students come from across the United States, North America, Europe, Asia, and Africa. The Academy also serves as the high school for the MSAD 72 school district. Over the years, Fryeburg Academy has had several of its students attend the Ivy Leagues, Little Ivies and the Maine Big Three. The school is known to be one of Maine's top feeder schools into many of the country's most prestigious undergraduate programs.

Gymnasium fire 
In the early morning hours of October 12, 2005, fire destroyed the Gibson Gymnasium at Fryeburg Academy. The fire was determined to be arson, and two former students were charged. As a result of the fire, a major capital campaign was implemented to fund a new and better athletic facility.

Notable alumni and faculty 
 Anna Barrows, early 20th century cooking lecturer
 Nathaniel S. Benton, New York politician 
 John W. Dana, former Maine Governor
 James Farrington, US Congressman
 Harvey Dow Gibson, financier
 Spalding Gray, actor and monologist 
Joseph M. Harper, US Congressman and Acting Governor of New Hampshire
 Rufus Porter, painter and founder of Scientific American
 Marc Murphy (chef), Celebrity Chef 
 James W. Ripley, US Congressman
 David S. Rohde, New York Times investigative reporter
 Casey Sherman, NY Times bestselling author of The Finest Hours, Bad Blood and Search for the Strangler
 Daniel Webster, lawyer and statesman(Former headmaster)
 David Woodsome, member of the Maine Senate from 2012- to present and former faculty.

Images

References

External links
 
Website of Fryeburg Academy

Educational institutions established in 1792
Private high schools in Maine
1792 establishments in Maine
Schools in Oxford County, Maine
Fryeburg, Maine
Boarding schools in Maine